Belarus is represented by 36 athletes at the 2006 European Athletics Championships. They had surprising success with getting a 3rd place in the medal table, after their neighbours Russia and Germany.

Results

Nations at the 2006 European Athletics Championships
2006
European Athletics Championships